"Bechwech" "('slowly') is a song recorded by the Algerian singer Yasmine Nayar in 2016 and released as a single in 2016. The song was a considerable success in its native Algeria and also managed to reach on the number one spot on a number of countries like Egypt, Syria, Jordan and Lebanon.

References

External links 
 

2016 singles
Yasmine Nayar songs
2016 songs
Arabic music
Middle Eastern music
Classical and art music traditions